Icejet was a charter airline based in Iceland. Icejet operated Fairchild Dornier 328JET business jets and was the only business jet operator based in Iceland. Icejet was a JAR-OPS (Joint Aviation Requirement) operator. It was founded in 2005 and ceased flights in August 2010.

Fleet

Icejet operated the following fleet:
3 Fairchild Dornier 328JET
2 in a 14-seat VIP (Envoy) configuration which had extended range modifications
1 in a 19-seat (Corporate Shuttle) configuration

References

External links

Official website (archived)

Defunct airlines of Iceland
Airlines established in 2005
Airlines disestablished in 2010